Shuhaimi Shafiei (27 February 1968 – 2 July 2018) was a Malaysian politician. Shafiei was a member of the People's Justice Party (PKR), a component party in the Pakatan Harapan (PH) ruling coalition. Shuhaimi worked for former Menteri Besar of Selangor; Mohamed Azmin Ali as a secretary. Shafiei represented Sri Muda seat in the Selangor State Legislative Assembly for two terms (2008-2018), and won reelection for Sungai Kandis seat instead in 2018 general election. He defeated three other candidates, but was unable to attend the swearing in ceremony due to ill health condition.

Death
Shafiei died of stage four lymphoma on 2 July 2018 at aged 50. His death caused the  Sungai Kandis by-election held on 4 August 2018 which was retained by PKR. Charges of sedition against Shafiei were dropped shortly after his death.

Election results

References

1960s births
2018 deaths
People from Perak
Malaysian people of Malay descent
Malaysian Muslims
Deaths from cancer in Malaysia
Deaths from lymphoma
People's Justice Party (Malaysia) politicians
Members of the Selangor State Legislative Assembly
21st-century Malaysian politicians